Ștefan Cătălin Țîră (born 18 June 1994) is a Romanian professional footballer who plays as a striker for Dinamo București.

His father, Fănel Țîră was also a footballer who spent most of his career at Rapid București.

Career

Club
On 1 August 2016, Țîră signed a one-year contract with Azerbaijan Premier League side Neftchi Baku.

On 25 October 2016, Țîră was sent-off in Neftchi's 2–0 defeat to Qarabağ, for hitting a pitch invader, and was subsequently banned from training. before having his contract with the club terminated on 30 October 2016.

On 11 August 2019, Țîră made his debut for Voluntari against Liga 1 rivals FCSB and scored after just 36 seconds in a 3–1 win.

In 2021 he became a member of lithuanian Sūduva. In 23 June 2021 he left club. He played six matches in Optibet A lyga and twice in I lyga.

He joined Romanian side Dinamo București in September 2021. He made 6 appearances for the club in Liga 1 during the 2021-2022 season, only one as a starting player. Țîră also played 2 games for Dinamo București in the Romanian Cup, scoring his single official goal for the club in the match lost against FC Argeș in the round of 16 match. He was released by the club in January 2022.

Honours
Rapid București
Liga II: 2015–16
ACS Șirineasa
Liga III: 2017–18

References

External links
 Voetbal International profile 
 
 

1994 births
Living people
Footballers from Bucharest
Romanian footballers
Romania under-21 international footballers
Association football forwards
Eredivisie players
ADO Den Haag players
Liga I players
FC Brașov (1936) players
CS Concordia Chiajna players
FC Rapid București players
ASC Daco-Getica București players
FC Viitorul Constanța players
FC Voluntari players
Liga II players
FC Dunărea Călărași players
ACS Viitorul Târgu Jiu players
CS Luceafărul Oradea players
FC Dinamo București players
Gamma Ethniki players
Episkopi F.C. players
Serie D players
A.S. Bisceglie Calcio 1913 players
Romanian expatriate footballers
Romanian expatriates in the Netherlands
Expatriate footballers in the Netherlands
Romanian expatriates in Greece
Expatriate footballers in Greece
Romanian expatriates in Italy
Expatriate footballers in Italy